Austin Opera, formerly known as the Austin Lyric Opera, is an opera company based in Austin, Texas. The company was founded in 1986. Its key personnel include Annie Burridge as general director, and Timothy Myers as artistic advisor.

In January 2007, it staged the North American premiere of Philip Glass’s opera Waiting for the Barbarians.

References

Further reading

External links
 

Music of Austin, Texas
Musical groups established in 1986
American opera companies
1986 establishments in Texas
Performing arts in Texas